Milton James "Jamie" Sands III is a United States Navy rear admiral and Navy SEAL who serves as the commander of Special Operations Command Africa since July 1, 2021. Sands most recently served as commander of the Naval Service Training Command from April 25, 2019 to May 27, 2021. Prior to that, he served as vice president of the Joint Special Operations University from 2018 to 2019, with prior tours as commodore of Naval Special Warfare Group 2 from 2016 to 2018 and commander of Seal Team 8.

Naval career
A native of Farmington, Connecticut, Sands graduated from Deerfield Academy in 1988 and the United States Naval Academy in 1992 with a Bachelor of Science in Oceanography and received a commission as an Ensign in the United States Navy. He served as a surface warfare officer assignments onboard Newport-class tank landing ship USS Saginaw (LST 1188) and Spruance-class destroyer USS John Rodgers (DD 983). He later volunteered for Basic Underwater Demolition/SEAL training at Naval Amphibious Base Coronado and graduated with BUD/S class 203 in 1995. His first operational assignment was with SEAL Delivery Vehicle Team 1.

Following SEAL Tactical Training (STT) and completion of six month probationary period, he received the 1130 designator as a Naval Special Warfare Officer, entitled to wear the Special Warfare insignia also known as "SEAL Trident". He later served with SEAL Team TWO, and assignment to a joint task force in Afghanistan 2002. He later was assigned as commanding officer of SEAL Team EIGHT. He holds a master's degree in Military Strategy and Planning from the Joint Advanced Warfighting School (JAWS).

In February 2023, he was assigned as chief of staff of the United States Special Operations Command.

References

Year of birth missing (living people)
Living people
Place of birth missing (living people)
People from Farmington, Connecticut
United States Naval Academy alumni
Military personnel from Connecticut
United States Navy SEALs personnel
United States Navy personnel of the War in Afghanistan (2001–2021)
Joint Forces Staff College alumni
Recipients of the Legion of Merit
United States Navy rear admirals (lower half)